Wagaicis is a genus of tree-fungus beetles in the family Ciidae.

Species
 Wagaicis wagae Wankowicz, 1869

References

Ciidae genera